The Ansvar Ladies Open was a women's professional golf tournament on the Swedish Golf Tour, played between 1989 and 1991. It was always held at Tobo Golf Club in Vimmerby, Sweden.

The event was introduced in 1989 as one of the only new regular events of the season, in addition to the Grundig Team Trophy.

The 1990 and 1991 events doubled as Swedish International tournaments.

Winners

See also
Swedish International

References

Swedish Golf Tour (women) events